is the twenty-fifth studio album by Japanese singer Akina Nakamori. It was released on 8 November 2017 under the Universal Music Group Japan label. The album was released as a part of the 35th debut anniversary celebration and on the same day as a cover album "Cage".

Background
The title of album comes from Nakamori's name, Akina. It's dated to be first time to use her name as a part of title in her discography history.

The album includes only nine tracks in total, which makes the shortest album in the terms of the length.

The theme of the album is to catch the atmosphere of the Kadokawa movie of the 80s.

Merry Christmas: Yuki no Shizuku was recorded as a vocal song and as a vocal song and as an instrumental song with a sound of a small music box.

After the release, Nakamori's music release activities has been suspended without announcement.

Promotion

Single
The album includes leading track, a b-side track Hirari: Sakura written by Kouhei Nemumoto and Haruichi Shindō from the duo Porno Graffitti, which was recorded in the leading single Fixer: While the Woman are sleeping in 2015. Hirari Sakura has received a special remixed version with subtitle Akina version, unlike original version, which starts straight with the vocal part, album version has a thirty-seconds long instrumental intro.

Chart performance
The album Akina debuted at number 9 on the Oricon Album Weekly Chart and charted for 6 weeks. On the Billboard Japanese charts, the album debuted at number 8 on Album Weekly Charts. On digital streaming service Recochoku's charts, the album debuted at number 2 on Digital Album Daily Charts and on number 10 on Digital Album Weekly Charts.

Track listing

References

2017 albums
Japanese-language albums
Akina Nakamori albums
Universal Music Japan albums